The 2008 U.S. Women's Open was the 63rd U.S. Women's Open, held June 26–29 at Interlachen Country Club in Edina, Minnesota, a suburb southwest of Minneapolis. It was the first U.S. Women's Open played at the course, which hosted the Solheim Cup in 2002.  The winner was 19-year-old Inbee Park, four strokes ahead of runner-up Helen Alfredsson. The tournament was televised by ESPN and NBC Sports.

The course hosted the U.S. Open in 1930, part of the grand slam of Bobby Jones.

Field

Exempt players
1. Last 10 U.S. Women's Open Champions
Juli Inkster, Birdie Kim, Cristie Kerr, Hilary Lunke, Meg Mallon, Se Ri Pak, Annika Sörenstam, Karrie Webb

2. Top two finishers in the 2007 U.S. Women's Amateur and winner of the 2006 U.S. Women's Amateur
Amanda Blumenherst (a), Kimberly Kim (a), Mariajo Uribe (a)

3. Last five LPGA Champions
Suzann Pettersen, Yani Tseng

4. Last five Women's British Open Champions
Jeong Jang, Lorena Ochoa, Sherri Steinhauer, Karen Stupples

5. Last five Kraft Nabisco Champions
Grace Park, Morgan Pressel

6. From the 2007 U.S. Women's Open, the 20 lowest scorers and ties.
Kyeong Bae, Paula Creamer, Julieta Granada, Amy Hung, Jimin Kang, Christina Kim, Mi Hyun Kim, Jee Young Lee, Brittany Lincicome, Catriona Matthew, Ai Miyazato, Angela Park, Inbee Park, Jiyai Shin, Angela Stanford

7. From the 2007 LPGA Tour money list, the top 40 money leaders
Shi Hyun Ahn, Nicole Castrale, Laura Davies, Laura Diaz, Meaghan Francella, Natalie Gulbis, Sophie Gustafson, Rachel Hetherington, Maria Hjorth, Pat Hurst, I.K. Kim, Young Kim, Brittany Lang, Sarah Lee, Seon Hwa Lee, Na On Min, Stacy Prammanasudh, Reilley Rankin, Lindsey Wright

8. From the 2008 LPGA Tour money, the top 35 money leaders through June 1
Minea Blomqvist, Na Yeon Choi, Allison Fouch, Hee-Won Han, Song-Hee Kim, Candie Kung, Leta Lindley, Teresa Lu, Jane Park, Momoko Ueda, Sun Young Yoo

9.  Winner of tournaments from the conclusion of last year's U.S. Women's Open until now
Louise Friberg

10. Top 3 players from the Japan LPGA Tour, LPGA of Korea Tour, and Ladies European Tour
Sun-Ju Ahn, Bettina Hauert, Jeon Mi-jeong, Eun-Hee Ji, Gwladys Nocera, Sakura Yokomine

Qualifiers

 Helen Alfredsson
 Sarah Almond (a)
 Chieko Amanuma
 Rachel Bailey
 Vanessa Brockett
 Laurie Brower
 Silvia Cavalleri
 Jeanne Cho-Hunicke
 Il Mi Chung
 Cydney Clanton (a)
 Eva Dahllof
 Diana D'Alessio
 Heather Daly-Donofrio
 Wendy Doolan
 Lauren Doughtie (a)
 Moira Dunn
 Kathleen Ekey (a)
 Courtney Ellenbogen (a)
 Shanshan Feng
 Jamie Fischer
 Danah Ford
 Tara Goedeken (a)
 Anna Grzebien
 Nicole Hage
 Kim Hall
 Sin Ham
 Candy Hannemann
 Mina Harigae
 Marcy Hart
 Janell Howland
 Katherine Hull
 Jang Ha-na (a)
 Na Ri Kim
 Carin Koch
 Jessica Korda (a)
 Kelli Kuehne
 Katrina Leckovic
 Erynne Lee (a)
 Jennie Lee (a)
 Joanne Lee (a)
 Meena Lee
 Stacy Lewis
 Tiffany Lua (a)
 Charlotte Mayorkas
 Jill McGill
 Patricia Meunier-Lebouc
 Sydnee Michaels (a)
 Janice Moodie
 Paola Moreno (a)
 Miriam Nagl
 Martha Nause
 Liselotte Neumann
 Virada Nirapathpongporn
 Angela Oh (a)
 Ji Young Oh
 Sunny Oh
 Cyd Okino (a)
 Kristen Park (a)
 Emily Powers (a)
 Michele Redman
 Jean Reynolds
 Jennifer Rosales
 Kristen Samp
 Giulia Sergas
 Alena Sharp
 Jenny Shin (a)
 Ashleigh Simon
 Karin Sjödin
 Jennifer Song (a)
 Bomi Suh
 Victoria Tanco (a)
 Alexis Thompson (a)
 Sherri Turner
 Gina Umeck
 Lynn Valentine
 Whitney Wade
 Alison Walshe (a)
 Linda Wessberg
 Michelle Wie
 Leah Wigger
 Carri Wood
 Amy Yang
 Aiko Yoshida
 Heather Young

(a) - amateur

Past champions in the field

Made the cut

Missed the cut

Course layout

Source:

Round summaries

First round
Thursday, June 26, 2008

The Open kicked off on Thursday with the field playing in threesomes starting from either the first tee or the tenth tee.  Featured threesomes included Annika Sörenstam, Suzann Pettersen, and Paula Creamer, ranked 2, 3, and 4 respectively in the world rankings. Sorenstam and Petterssen opened their U.S. Opens with scores of 75 (+2) and 77 (+4) respectively. Creamer shot a 70 to move three shots off the pace. The other featured threesome included number one ranked player Lorena Ochoa, defending U.S. Open champion Cristie Kerr, and 2007 U.S. Women's Amateur champion Maria José Uribe. Uribe led that group with a 69 to lead all amateurs and end the day in a tie for fourth overall; Kerr shot a 1-under 72; Ochoa had an up-and-down round of even-par 73. The rounds of the day belonged to Ji Young Oh, who had eight birdies and two bogeys and to Pat Hurst who had six birdies and an eagle. Oh and Hurst tied after Round 1 at six-under par 67.

Second round
Friday, June 27, 2008
Saturday, June 28, 2008

With Thursday's rounds completed many well-known American players took a step down on the competition while many lesser-known and international players took a step up. A two-hour weather delay required some to finish their rounds on Saturday morning. Angela Park had an even round on Thursday, and a 6-under 67 in the second round. She held a one-stroke lead over three others: Inbee Park of Korea, Helen Alfredsson of Sweden, and the only Finnish player in the tournament, Minea Blomqvist. The two leading Americans were Paula Creamer and Cristie Kerr at 4-under 142. Both first-round leaders took a severe fall on Friday, with Ji Young Oh, who had to finish her second round on Saturday due to the weather delay, shooting a 76 and Pat Hurst turning in a 5-over 78. Many top-ranked or well-known players missed the cut, including Laura Davies (70-81), Natalie Gulbis (73-80), 13-year-old Alexis Thompson (75-77), 2003 champion and Minnesotan Hilary Lunke (74-78), Juli Inkster (74-81), and Michelle Wie (81-75).

Third round
Saturday, June 28, 2008

Final round
Sunday, June 29, 2008

Source:

Scorecard 
Final round

Cumulative tournament scores, relative to par
Source:

References

External links

U.S. Women's Open – past champions – 2008

U.S. Women's Open
Golf in Minnesota
Sports competitions in Minnesota
Edina, Minnesota
Women's sports in Minnesota
U.S. Women's Open
U.S. Women's Open
U.S. Women's Open
U.S. Women's Open